Dragon Warrior is the former name in North America of Dragon Quest, a video game franchise and series.

Dragon Warrior may also refer to:

 Dragon Warrior (video game), former North American name of the first game of the Dragon Quest franchise
 Dragon Warrior (wrestler), ring name of Craig Classic, an American professional wrestler
 Po (Kung Fu Panda) or Dragon Warrior, a character in Kung Fu Panda
 Dragon Warriors, a fantasy role-playing game